was a town located in Naka District, Tokushima Prefecture, Japan.

As of 2003, the town had an estimated population of 10,576 and a density of 567.08 persons per km². The total area was 18.65 km².

On March 20, 2006, Nakagawa, along with the town of Hanoura (also from Naka District), was merged into the expanded city of Anan.

External links
 Anan official website 

Dissolved municipalities of Tokushima Prefecture
Anan, Tokushima